The Oppenheim Family is a 1938 (released in May 1939 in the USA) Soviet drama film, directed by Grigori Roshal. It is one of the earliest film directly dealing with the persecution of Jews in Nazi Germany. Based on The Oppermanns - a novel by Lion Feuchtwanger.

Cast
Vladimir Balashov - Berthold Oppenheim
Joseph Tolchanov - Martin Oppenheim
Ada Wójcik - Liselotte
Nikolai Plotnikov - Edgar Oppenheim
Galina Minovitskaya - Ruth Oppenheim
Raisa Esipova - Sybil
Osip Abdulov - Jacques Lavendel
S.D. Zykov - Heinrich Lavendel, schoolboy, friend of Bertolt
Solomon Mikhoels - Jacobi
Sergey Dnieper - Francois, director of the gymnasium
Arkady Blagonravov - Lorenz, director of the clinic
Nikolay Bogolyubov - Weller
Vladimir Solovyov - Pahinke
Aleksey Konsovsky - Richard
Mikhail Astangov - Vogelsang
Konstantin Karelian - Rittersteg
Sergey Martinson - Gutwetter poet
Mikhail Derzhavin - Wells, industrialist

External links
THE SCREEN; 'The Oppenheim Family,' Soviet Film Version of a Feuchtwanger Novel, Arrives at the Cameo, NYT

1939 films
1939 drama films
Soviet drama films
1930s Russian-language films
Films shot in Russia
Films set in Germany
Films about Jews and Judaism
Films about Nazi Germany
Films based on German novels
Articles containing video clips
Films directed by Grigori Roshal
Soviet black-and-white films